Slimbridge Association Football Club is an English football club representing the village of Slimbridge, near Dursley, Gloucestershire (although its ground is in nearby Cambridge). The first team currently plays in the Southern League, the reserve team in the Hellenic League Division Two West, and the Under-18 Youth team in the Cheltenham Under-18 Floodlit Youth League. The club is affiliated to the Gloucestershire County FA.

History
Slimbridge Football Club's history can be traced back to the 1899–1900 season when they played local football at various venues in and around the village, but as they do not appear to have played matches every season initially, the club officially dates its foundation to 1902.
  
In 1951 the club moved to their current ground at Wisloe Road (now Thornhill Park) after Evi Thornhill, a former player, bequeathed the land on which the ground stands to the club in his will. From then until the 1990s, the club mainly competed in the Stroud and District League, except for a spell in the Gloucestershire Northern Senior League in the 1960s. In the late 1980s, after a period of severe financial difficulties had been overcome, the club was finally able to upgrade its facilities and step up to the Gloucestershire County League, where they finished runners-up in their first season and were promoted to the Hellenic League Division One West.
  
The success continued with the Division One West title at the first attempt and with it promotion to the Premier Division, where three top-five finishes were achieved in the first three seasons, before the club clinched the championship in 2006–07. This earned promotion to the Southern League, but on 10 July 2007, the club made the following announcement on their website:

As a result, the first team took the reserves' place in the Gloucestershire Northern Senior League. They won the league at the first attempt, and were promoted to the Gloucestershire County League where the club maintained back to back promotions by winning promotion back to the Hellenic League.

The club re-established itself in the Hellenic League Premier Division, and with Leon Sterling and assistant Fred Ward at the helm on the pitch, the club achieved sixth place (2010–11 season) and fifth place (2011–12 season) finishes upon their return to the top flight of the Hellenic League. In 2013 they transferred to the Western League Premier Division.

After the club secured a third-place finish in the Western League Premier Division at the end of the 2014-15 season, it was confirmed that they had earned promotion to the Southern League.

Ground
The club's ground was formerly called Wisloe Road  but changed its name on 26 July 2016 to Thornhill Park, in honours of former chairman Evi Thornhill, who gave the land to the club.

The record attendance at the ground is 525 for a game against Shortwood United in 2003. Average attendance is around 100. 

The ground also plays host to the home games of Forest Green Rovers' women's team.

Honours
Hellenic League Premier Division
Champions 2006–07
Gloucestershire Northern Senior League
Champions 2007–08
Gloucestershire County League
Champions 2008–09
Hellenic League West One
Champions 2002–03, 2009–10

References

Sources

Slimbridge profile on the official Hellenic League website

External links
Official website

Football clubs in England
Football clubs in Gloucestershire
Association football clubs established in 1902
1902 establishments in England
Stroud District
Stroud and District Football League
Gloucestershire Northern Senior League
Gloucestershire County Football League
Hellenic Football League
Western Football League
Southern Football League clubs